Kingdom is a Japanese manga series written and illustrated by Yasuhisa Hara. It provides a fictionalized account of the Warring States period primarily through the experiences of the war orphan Xin and his comrades as he fights to become the greatest general under the heavens, and in doing so, unifying China for the first time in 500 years.

Kingdom has been has been serialized in Weekly Young Jump since January 26, 2006, with its chapters collected into sixty-seven tankōbon volumes by publisher Shueisha as of January 19, 2023.


Volume list

Chapters not yet published in volume format
These chapters have yet to be published in a tankōbon volume. They were originally serialized in Japanese in issues of Weekly Young Jump from October 2022 to January 2023.

References

Kingdom